Parlay X was a set of standard Web service  APIs for the telephone network (fixed and mobile). It is defunct and now replaced by OneAPI, which is the current valid standard from the GSM association for Telecom third party API.

It enables software developers to use the capabilities of an underlying network. The APIs are deliberately high level abstractions and designed to be simple to use. An application developer can, for example, invoke a single Web Service request to  get the location of a mobile device or initiate a telephone call.

The Parlay X Web services are defined jointly by ETSI,  the Parlay Group, and the Third Generation Partnership Project (3GPP). OMA has done the maintenance of the specifications for 3GPP release 8. 

The APIs are defined using Web Service technology: interfaces are defined using WSDL 1.1  and conform with  Web Services Interoperability (WS-I Basic Profile). 

The APIs are published as a set of specifications.

In general Parlay X provides an abstraction of functionality exposed by the more complex, but functionally richer Parlay APIs. 
ETSI provide a set of (informative not normative) Parlay X to Parlay mapping documents. 

Parlay X services have been rolled out by a number of telecom operators, including BT, Korea Telecom, T-Com, Mobilekom and Sprint.

External links
The last version of the original Parlay X website, as of 2013 on archive.org
OneAPI GSMA's current API inherits of Parlay X purposes
Parlay X Version 3.0 Specifications
Parlay X Version 2.1 Specifications
Parlay X Version 4.0 Specifications
Parlay X, Ericsson Developer Program
Java SE Components for Telecom Web Services (Parlay X made easy through JavaBeans)
Telecom Web Services Network Emulator (Parlay X emulator)
Getting started with ParlayX

Telecommunications standards
Application programming interfaces
Web services